The New Swinton Stadium is a proposed rugby league stadium in the Agecroft area of Pendlebury in the City of Salford. It is to be the home of Swinton RLFC. Upon completion, Swinton will return to the borough after selling off Station Road in 1992.

Since 2006 a plan had been put in place to bring the Lions home and, to that end, the team did train on the site for a short time. Work has yet to be commenced, however, as the Lions lacked a financial backer and were operating at semi-pro level. However, money was raised and work was scheduled to commence in 2012. A meeting was called in early September 2012 to confirm that progress was being made on the project.

The club have been playing at numerous venues since leaving Swinton and were (2015) back playing their home fixtures at Park Lane, Whitefield, home of Sedgley Park R.U.F.C. after playing at Leigh Sports Village in consecutive seasons 2012-14. However, after gaining promotion back into the Championship (2nd tier) at the end of the 2015 season, the club sought permission to erect a temporary additional stand at Park Lane for season 2016 to meet the minimum seating (750) requirements laid down by the RFL but have encountered complaints to Bury Council from local residents. They have therefore agreed to move their home games to Heywood Road, Sale, home of Sale F.C. rugby union club.

As of 4 March 2016 the project is back on the agenda as announced by the club.

A new board of directors headed by new club chairman Andy Mazey announced on 18 October 2017 an agreement between the club and Moorside Rangers F.C. to work together to make the stadium plans happen over the next 3–5 years. It is hoped that progress will be made in three phases.

See also

List of rugby league stadiums by capacity

References

External links

Rugby league stadiums in England
Proposed stadiums in the United Kingdom
Sports venues in Greater Manchester
Proposed buildings and structures in England